All of Us Are Dead is a South Korean coming-of-age zombie apocalypse horror streaming television series. It stars  Park Ji-hu, Yoon Chan-young, Cho Yi-hyun, Lomon, Yoo In-soo, Lee Yoo-mi, Kim Byung-chul, Lee Kyu-hyung, and Jeon Bae-soo. The series mostly takes place at a high school in South Korea as a zombie apocalypse suddenly breaks out and threatens the safety of the students. It is based on the Naver webtoon of the same name by Joo Dong-geun, which was published between 2009 and 2011. This series was filmed at Sunghee Girls' High School in Andong, South Korea. 

The series was released on January 28, 2022, on Netflix. Following its release, the series was watched over 474.26 million hours in its first 30 days on the service. On June 6, 2022, the series was renewed for a second season.

Overview
After a failed science experiment, a local high school is overrun with zombies, and the trapped students struggle to survive. With no food or water, and communication cut-off by the government, they must use equipment around the school to protect themselves in the midst of a battleground or they will become part of the infected.

Cast and characters

Main cast 
 Yoon Chan-young as Lee Cheong-san
 A student of Class 2–5, he is On-jo's neighbor and childhood friend.
Park Ji-hu as Nam On-jo
 A student of Class 2–5, she is Cheong-san's neighbor and childhood friend.
 Cho Yi-hyun as Choi Nam-ra
 The class president of Class 2–5.
 Lomon as Lee Su-hyeok, nicknamed "Bare-su"
 A student of Class 2-5 who is a reformed ex-delinquent.
 Yoo In-soo as Yoon Gwi-nam
 A school delinquent who is a student from Class 2-1 and the series' main antagonist.
 Lee Yoo-mi as Lee Na-yeon
 A wealthy but arrogant student of Class 2–5.
 Kim Byung-chul as Lee Byeong-chan
 A life science teacher at Hyosan High and creator of the virus, serving as the series' overarching antagonist. He initially worked as a researcher at a pharmaceutical company but quit.
 Lee Kyu-hyung as Song Jae-ik
 A detective of Hyosan Police Station.
 Jeon Bae-soo as Nam So-ju
 Captain of the Hyosan Fire Station rescue team 1, and On-jo's father.

Supporting cast
 Im Jae-hyuk as Yang Dae-su
 A student of Class 2-5 and Woo-jin's best friend.
 Kim Bo-yoon as Seo Hyo-ryung
 A reclusive student of Class 2–5.
 Ahn Seung-gyun as Oh Joon-yeong
 The top student of Class 2-5 and the second in the school.
 Ham Sung-min as Han Gyeong-su
 A student of Class 2-5 and Cheong-san's best friend, who comes from a low-income family.
 Kim Joo-ah as Yoon I-sak
 A student of Class 2-5 and On-jo's best friend.
 Kim Jin-young as Kim Ji-min
 A student of Class 2–5, Hyo-ryung's best friend, and member of the school's choir.
 Son Sang-yeon as Jang Woo-jin
 A student of Class 2-5 and Ha-ri's younger brother.
 Kim Jung-yeon as Kim Min-ji
 A student of Class 2-5 and Dae-su's friend.
 Ha Seung-ri as Jang Ha-ri
 A final-year senior student who competes in archery and Woo-jin's elder sister.
 Lee Eun-saem as Park Mi-jin
 A final-year senior student.
 Jin Ho-eun as Jung Min-jae
 A final-year senior student and member of the school's archery club.
 Yang Han-yeol as Yoo Jun-seong
 A final-year senior student, and Mi-jin's friend.
 Hwang Bo-un as Lee Ha-lim
 A final-year senior student and Jun-seong's friend.
 Oh Hye-soo as Min Eun-ji
 A student of Class 2-1 and bullying victim of Gwi-nam.
 Ahn Ji-ho as Kim Chul-soo
 A student of Class 2-1 and bullying victim of Gwi-nam.
 Jung Yi-seo as Kim Hyeon-ju
 A student of Class 2-5 and a delinquent.
 Lee Chae-eun as Park Hee-su
 A student of Class 2-5 who is pregnant.
 Lee Min-goo as Lee Jin-su
 A student and Byeong-chan's son who is bullied.
 Oh Hee-joon as Son Myung-hwan
 A student and the leader of the delinquents.
 Shin Jae-hwi as Park Chang-hoon
 A student who participates in the bullying of students at the school.
 Lee Sang-hee as Park Sun-hwa
 An English professor and the form teacher of Class 2–5.
 Yoon Byung-hee as Kang Jin-goo
 A sports teacher.
 Ahn Si-ha as Kim Kyung-mi
 The school's nurse.
 Yoon Kyung-ho as Jung Yong-nam
 A Korean teacher and the school's dean.
 Um Hyo-sup as the school's principal.
 Park Jae-chul as Jeon Ho-chul
 An auxiliary police officer who befriends Jae-ik
 Lee Si-hoon as "Orangibberish"
 A live streamer.
 Lee Ji-hyun as Cheong-san's mother, who operates a fried chicken restaurant in Hyosan, and deeply cares for her son.
 Woo Ji-hyun as Kim Woo-shin
 The youngest member of the Hyosan Fire Station rescue team 1.
 Dong Hyun-bae as Park Young-hwan
 A paramedic of the Hyosan Fire Station rescue team 1.
 Bae Hae-sun as Park Eun-hee
 A member of the National Assembly representing Hyosan.
 Jo Dal-hwan as Jo Dal-ho
 A senior aide.

Episodes
All of Us Are Dead consists of one season with twelve episodes at a run time of 53 to 72 minutes. The full series was released in all Netflix worldwide markets on January 28, 2022.

Production 
On April 12, 2020, Netflix announced through a press release that JTBC Studios and Film Monster would produce a series called All of Us Are Dead based on the popular webtoon Now at Our School. On April 19, 2020, Yoon Chan-young was confirmed to star in the series as one of the students. Park Ji-hu joined the main cast on April 22. On July 1, they were officially joined by Cho Yi-hyun, Lomon and Yoo In-soo. In selecting the cast, director Lee Jae-kyoo said, "I thought that bringing on actors who were great at acting but still unknown to the public would add to the immersion of the series".

Production was temporarily suspended in August 2020 due to the re-spreading of COVID-19 pandemic in South Korea.

Reception
The review aggregator website Rotten Tomatoes reported an approval rating of 87% based on 23 reviews, with an average rating of 6.90/10. The site's critical consensus reads, "While All of Us Are Dead loses some of its bite with an overlong season, its emotional grounding puts plenty of meat on the bone." Metacritic gave it a weighted average score of 67 out of 100 based on reviews from 5 critics, indicating "generally favorable reviews".

IGN rated the series a 7 out of 10 and noted that the series was "clever, thrilling, and also... a bit exhausting." Variety praised the series, stating it "makes the most out of its nightmarish central location to otherworldly, dizzying effect." The series received generally positive reviews for its performances, screenplay, and action sequences, although its long runtime was criticized.

Accolades

References

External links
 
 
 
 All of Us Are Dead (Korean) at Line Webtoon 
 All of Us Are Dead (English) at Line Webtoon

Korean-language Netflix original programming
2022 South Korean television series debuts
South Korean horror fiction television series
South Korean high school television series
South Korean teen dramas
South Korean drama web series
Television shows based on South Korean webtoons
Television series about viral outbreaks
Zombies in television
Television productions suspended due to the COVID-19 pandemic
Television series about teenagers
Television series by JTBC Studios
Television series by Kim Jong-hak Production
Television shows set in Gyeonggi Province